Bazilevsky is a rural locality (a village) in Baykibashevsky Selsoviet, Karaidelsky District, Bashkortostan, Russia. The population was 47 as of 2010. There are 3 streets.

Geography 
Bazilevsky is located 18 km west of Karaidel (the district's administrative centre) by road. Aminevo is the nearest rural locality.

References 

Rural localities in Karaidelsky District